Dangi-ye Akbarabad (also Romanized as Dāngī-ye Akbarābād; also known as Ţāleqānī, Dānakī, and Dūnkī) is a village in Zagheh Rural District, Zagheh District, Khorramabad County, Lorestan Province, Iran. At the 2006 census, its population was 622, in 135 families.

References 

Towns and villages in Khorramabad County